The Van Riper House is a Bergen Dutch sandstone house located in Nutley, New Jersey, built in 1708. The building was owned in the 20th century by ITT Corporation and served as executives' residence and offices.  In 2001, the building and 0.9 acres of land were transferred to the municipal government who then leased it to Van Riper House, Inc., a nonprofit corporation, for twenty years, with the intention that it would be restored and preserved.

See also
List of the oldest buildings in New Jersey
National Register of Historic Places listings in Essex County, New Jersey
Vreeland Homestead
Kingsland Manor

References

Houses in Essex County, New Jersey
Nutley, New Jersey
Stone houses in New Jersey